IPA commonly refers to:

 India pale ale, a style of beer
 International Phonetic Alphabet, a system of phonetic notation
 Isopropyl alcohol, a chemical compound

IPA may also refer to:

Organizations

International
 Insolvency Practitioners Association, of the UK and Ireland
 Institute of Public Administration (disambiguation)
 International Permafrost Association
 International Phonetic Association, behind the International Phonetic Alphabet
 International Play Association
 International Police Association
 International Polka Association
 International Presentation Association, network of Presentation Sisters
 International Psychoanalytical Association
 International Publishers Association, representing book and journal publishing

Australia
 Institute of Public Accountants
 Institute of Public Affairs

India
 Indian Pharmacist Association
 Indian Polo Association

United Kingdom
 Infrastructure and Projects Authority
 Institute of Practitioners in Advertising
 Involvement and Participation Association, for employee involvement in the workplace

United States
 Independence Party of America
 Independent Pilots Association
 Independent practice association, of physicians
 Innovations for Poverty Action
 Innovative Products of America, a tool manufacturer
 Institute for Propaganda Analysis
 Island Pacific Academy, Hawaii

Other
 Independent Psychiatric Association of Russia
 Institute of Public Affairs, Poland
 Instituto Superior Autónomo de Estudos Politécnicos, Portugal

Science
 3-Indolepropionic acid, a biological substance
 Ipa (spider), a genus of spiders

Technology
 .ipa, extension for Apple iOS applications
 "Identity, Policy, and Audit", as in FreeIPA
 Intermediate power amplifier of a radio transmitter
 Software for biologists from Ingenuity Systems

Other uses
 Important Plant Areas, a UK programme
 Indigenous Protected Area, Australia
 Instrument for Pre-Accession Assistance, EU funding programme
 Interpretative phenomenological analysis to psychological qualitative research
 Investigatory Powers Act 2016, a piece of UK legislation